Ernst Steven van Giezen (born 1 July 1977) is a former Dutch international cricketer who represented the Dutch national side in a single match in 2005. He played as a left-arm pace bowler.

Van Giezen was born in Schiedam, and played his club cricket for Hermes DVS and VOC Rotterdam. He made his senior debut for the Netherlands in August 2005, in an Intercontinental Cup game against Ireland. In the match, which held first-class status, he opened the bowling with Edgar Schiferli in Ireland's only innings, taking 2/107. In April 2006, van Giezen represented a Netherlands A team in the EurAsia Cricket Series, where matches held List A status. In the opening match against India A, he was the only Dutch bowler to take a wicket, finishing with 3/48 as his team lost by 202 runs. He took 2/57 in the next match, against Sri Lanka A, but in the final match against Pakistan A went wicketless.

References

External links
Player profile and statistics at Cricket Archive
Player profile and statistics at ESPNcricinfo

1977 births
Living people
Dutch cricketers
Sportspeople from Schiedam